Priesthill & Darnley railway station is a railway station serving the Priesthill and Darnley districts of Glasgow, Scotland. The station is managed by ScotRail and is on the Glasgow South Western Line.

History
Opened by British Rail under the ScotRail sector on 23 April 1990.

Facilities
The station is unmanned and previously had no ticketing provisions however, in 2018, ticket machines were installed. There are waiting shelters on each platform and train running information is provided via CIS displays, automated announcement and help points on each side.  Level access is only possible to platform 1, as platform 2 access requires the use of a steep ramp.

Services
However, there is one service to Carlisle which calls here on Sundays only.

From 21 May 2017 there is an hourly Sunday service between Glasgow Central and Kilmarnock that calls.

References

Railway stations in Glasgow
Railway stations opened by British Rail
Railway stations in Great Britain opened in 1990
SPT railway stations
Railway stations served by ScotRail